Joseph O'Rourke may refer to:

Joseph Cornelius O'Rourke (1772–1849), Russian nobleman and military leader
Joseph O'Rourke (professor), researcher in computational geometry
Joseph O'Rourke (activist) (1938–2008), Catholic ex-priest and pro-choice activist